Clavus aglaia is a species of sea snail, a marine gastropod mollusk in the family Drilliidae.

Description
The length of the shell attains 30 mm. A species of a solid build, white, with a violet apex and a few brownish spots scattered here and there on the upper halves of the ribs, and dotted with the same colour immediately beneath the suture.

Distribution
This species occurs in the Northwest Indian Ocean off Mumbai.

References

 Apte, D. 1998. Book of Indian shells. Oxford University Press

External links
 Smith, E.A. (1888) Diagnoses of new species of Pleurotomidae in the British Museum. Annals and Magazine of Natural History, series 6, 2, 300–317

aglaia
Gastropods described in 1918